Francis T. Bacon was the supervising architect of the Illinois Central Railroad system from the mid-1890s until 1907. Bacon died in Chicago on June 18, 1909, at the age of 43, after having been in private practice for two years.

Works 
 Union Station, Madison Street, Springfield, Illinois, 1896, NRHP-listed
 Illinois Central Railroad Main Station, Champaign, Illinois, 1898
Illinois Central Office Building, Carbondale, Illinois, 1899
 Illinois Central Railroad Station, Decatur, Illinois, 1899
 Fort Dodge & Omaha (Illinois Central) Station, Council Bluffs, Iowa, 1900
 Fort Dodge & Omaha (Illinois Central) Station, Denison, Iowa, 1900
 Illinois Central Railroad Passenger Depot, 111 South Illinois Avenue, Carbondale, Illinois, 1903, NRHP-listed
 Illinois Central Railroad Van Buren Street Station, Chicago, Illinois
 Illinois Central 12th Street Station Annex, Chicago, Illinois
 Union Station, Memphis, Tennessee
 Illinois Central warehouses, New Orleans, Louisiana

Gallery

References 

19th-century American architects
American railway architects
Illinois Central Railroad people